Sándor Németh (8 August 1925 – 7 December 1993) was a Hungarian  swimmer who won a bronze medal in the 200 m breaststroke at the 1947 European Aquatics Championships. He competed in the same event at the 1948 Summer Olympics, but did not reach the finals.

References

1925 births
1993 deaths
Male breaststroke swimmers
Swimmers at the 1948 Summer Olympics
Olympic swimmers of Hungary
Hungarian male swimmers
European Aquatics Championships medalists in swimming
People from Sümeg
Sportspeople from Veszprém County
20th-century Hungarian people